Novobiktimirovo (Yañı Biktimer) is a rural locality (a village) in Staropetrovsky Selsoviet, Birsky District, Bashkortostan, Russia. The population was 34 as of 2010. There is one street.

Geography 
Novobiktimirovo is located 29 km south of Birsk (the district's administrative centre) by road. Starobiktimirovo is the nearest rural locality.

References 

Rural localities in Birsky District